Epierus cornutus is a species of clown beetle in the family Histeridae. It is found in Central America and North America.

References

Further reading

 

Histeridae
Articles created by Qbugbot
Beetles described in 1893